Bump Mountain is a mountain located in the Catskill Mountains of New York northeast of Ashland. Richtmyer Peak is located north-northeast, The Knob is located west, and Ashland Pinnacle is located west-southwest of Bump Mountain.

References

Mountains of Greene County, New York
Mountains of New York (state)